The 1993 Asian Women's Volleyball Championship was the seventh Asian Championship, a biennial international volleyball tournament organised by the Asian Volleyball Confederation (AVC) with Chinese Volleyball Association (CVA). The tournament was held in Shanghai, China from 24 to 30 July 1993.

Pools composition
The teams are seeded based on their final ranking at the 1991 Asian Women's Volleyball Championship.

Preliminary round

Pool A

|}

|}

Pool B

|}

|}

Pool C

|}

|}

Pool D

|}

|}

Quarterfinals 
 The results and the points of the matches between the same teams that were already played during the preliminary round shall be taken into account for the Quarterfinals.

Pool E

|}

|}

Pool F

|}

|}

Pool G

|}

|}

Pool H

|}

|}

Classification 5th–14th

13th place

|}

11th place

|}

9th place

|}

7th place

|}

5th place

|}

Final round

Semifinals

|}

3rd place

|}

Final

|}

Final standing

References
Results (Archived 2009-05-10)

International volleyball competitions hosted by China
A
Asian women's volleyball championships
V